Texas Association of Magicians (also known simply as TAOM) is an American organization which hosts magic conventions each year, in different locations around Texas each Labor Day weekend.

It started in 1944, with picnics hosted by an Austin magician named Herman Yerger, and then the formal TAOM organization was formed on September 1, 1946.  It grew over the years to become one of the major gatherings of magicians in the United States, on par with such events as Abbott's Get Together and the Midwest Magic Jubilee, with a combination of lectures, demonstrations, and competitions.

Locations

Future conventions
 Houston, 2023

Past conventions

 Fort Worth, 2022
 Austin, 2021
 San Antonio, 2019
 Houston, 2018
 Frisco, 2017
 Corpus Christi, 2016
 Austin, 2015
 Fort Worth, 2014
 Dallas, 2013
 Houston, 2012
 San Antonio, 2011
 Austin, 2010
 Houston, 2009
 Fort Worth, 2008
 Corpus Christi, 2007
 Dallas, 2006
 San Antonio, 2005
 Houston, 2004
 Lubbock, 2003
 Fort Worth, 2002
 Corpus Christi, 2001
 Dallas, 2000
 Austin, 1999
 San Antonio, 1998
 Fort Worth, 1997
 Houston, 1996
 Lubbock, 1995
 San Antonio, 1994
 Austin, 1993
 Corpus Christi, 1992
 Tyler, 1991
 Dallas, 1990
 Houston, 1989
 Fort Worth, 1988
 Corpus Christi, 1987
 Dallas, 1986
 San Antonio, 1985
 Abilene, 1984
 Austin, 1983
 Fort Worth, 1982
 Houston, 1981
 Dallas, 1980

References
 Official website

Magic conventions
Magic organizations
1946 establishments in Texas
Conventions in Texas